"Walk Like a Man" is the 82nd episode of the HBO television series The Sopranos, the fifth episode of the second half of the show's sixth season, and the 17th episode of the season overall. Written and directed by executive producer Terence Winter in his directorial debut, it originally aired on May 6, 2007, and was watched by 7.16 million viewers upon its premiere.

Starring
 James Gandolfini as Tony Soprano
 Lorraine Bracco as Dr. Jennifer Melfi 
 Edie Falco as Carmela Soprano
 Michael Imperioli as Christopher Moltisanti
 Dominic Chianese as Corrado Soprano, Jr.*
 Steven Van Zandt as Silvio Dante
 Tony Sirico as Paulie Gualtieri
 Robert Iler as Anthony Soprano, Jr.
 Jamie-Lynn Sigler as Meadow Soprano
 Aida Turturro as Janice Soprano Baccalieri
 Steve Schirripa as Bobby Baccalieri
 Dan Grimaldi as Patsy Parisi
 Carl Capotorto as Little Paulie Germani

* = credit only

Guest starring

Synopsis
A.J. struggles with depression after his breakup with Blanca. He quits his job at the pizzeria, sulks around the house, and makes comments suggesting thoughts of suicide. Attempting to help him, Tony has A.J. attend a party at the Bada Bing with "the two Jasons" – Jason Gervasi and Jason Parisi. As he accompanies them from one party to another, he begins to associate with a profitable sports betting business they are running at school. At one frat party, they use A.J.'s SUV to take a kid who owes them money into the woods. They pour sulfuric acid on his toes while A.J. helps hold him down. Tony tells Dr. Melfi he was going to permanently quit therapy but has decided against it in light of A.J.'s problems, and laments that A.J. has inherited "my rotten fucking putrid genes."

Tony speaks to FBI Agents Harris and Goddard about Ahmed and Muhammad, who have stopped visiting the Bada Bing, and gives them the cellphone number one of them had used.

Christopher and Paulie are selling stolen power tools through a hardware store belonging to Christopher's father-in-law, and dividing the take. However, Christopher is seeing the others in the crew less than before. At a barbecue that he and Kelli host, Tony tells him that his absence from Soprano family gatherings could be seen as a lack of commitment; Christopher reminds him that he is avoiding such meetings to keep his sobriety, as there is always alcohol around. He tells Tony that his father, Dickie Moltisanti, wasn't much more than "a fucking junkie."

Paulie sends Little Paulie and Jason Molinaro to break into the hardware store and steal some items, which they sell to Paulie's Cuban contacts in Miami. Christopher confronts Paulie and demands compensation; Paulie crudely rebuffs him. Tony brushes off Christopher's complaints. Christopher finds himself increasingly sidelined in the family, with Bobby apparently taking his position in Tony's inner circle. When Little Paulie steals again from the hardware store, Christopher tracks him down and throws him out of a third-floor window. He survives, but with six broken vertebrae. Paulie vandalizes Christopher's landscaped front garden with his Cadillac CTS.

Tony makes peace between Christopher and Paulie, and the money situation is worked out. The two reconcile their differences at the Bing, where Christopher drinks with Paulie to mark the occasion. Christopher gets drunk and rambles about his daughter, causing Paulie to make some off-color jokes. Christopher thinks everyone is laughing at him, Tony most of all, and abruptly leaves. He goes straight to J.T.'s apartment, but J.T. cannot help him much as he is no longer Christopher's sponsor, he has work to do, and it is dangerous for him to hear the things Christopher starts to tell him. Rebuffing him, he says, "You're in the Mafia." After a few seconds, Christopher quietly says, "Fine", and begins to walk away, before turning around and killing J.T. with a shot to the head.

First appearances
Jason Parisi: son of Patsy Parisi and a friend of A.J. Soprano and Jason Gervasi. He attends Rutgers University and is part of a small-time crew that runs sports book operations at his college. He and Jason Gervasi are known as "The Jasons".
Walden Belfiore: soldier in the Gervasi crew, seen at the Bada Bing! with the other mobsters.
Dr. Richard Vogel: A.J.'s psychiatrist

Deceased
 "J.T." Dolan: murdered by Christopher Moltisanti, after refusing to listen to his story about the Mafia.

Title reference
 The episode's title refers to the song "Walk Like a Man" by Frankie Valli and the Four Seasons, which is about a father telling his son to get over a woman who left him. Tony tries to pull A.J. out of his depression over the breakup with Blanca. Frankie Valli himself formerly had a role in the series as New York capo Rusty Millio, and an earlier episode ("Big Girls Don't Cry") was also named after a Valli song.
 The phrase alludes to the belief that a man should be tough. A.J. should get over Blanca, Chris should get over his weaknesses for drink and drugs.

Production
 Carl Capotorto (Little Paulie Germani) is promoted to the main cast and billed in the opening credits but only for this episode.
 "Walk Like a Man" is the directorial debut of Terence Winter, a Sopranos writer and producer since the second season, who also wrote this episode. Winter, along with creator David Chase is one of only two screenwriters on the show to have both written and directed a single episode at the same time.
 Georgie the bartender of Bada Bing! returns in this episode for a brief final appearance, despite having been severely abused by Tony in "Cold Cuts", which led to Georgie's resignation, and his insistence for Tony to stay away from him. He was apparently later reasoned with and convinced to come back after a pay-off from Tony.
 The scene where Christopher observes mobsters laughing in slow-motion and looks for Tony's reaction, in particular, is similar to the scene from "All Happy Families..." where Tony observes the slowly laughing Mafiosi and gives most attention to Feech La Manna's reaction. Both Tony and Christopher seem to look for how these important people genuinely value them in the difficult-to-fake situation of immediate laughter.

Connections to prior episodes
 Christopher and Paulie have feuded many times in the past, most notably in episodes "Fortunate Son" when Christopher became made, "Second Opinion" when Paulie harassed Christopher and sniffed Adriana's panties, "Pine Barrens" when they got lost in the woods, "The Strong, Silent Type" when Christopher's drug intervention took place, and "Two Tonys" when Christopher had to pay for Paulie's outrageous restaurant bills.
 Tony turns down Dr. Melfi's offer to recommend a therapist for A.J., saying her previous referral for Meadow was "incompetent," referring to the psychotherapist who encouraged her to take a gap year in college and go on a trip to Europe in "No Show".

Other cultural and historical references
 In the opening scene, Tony walks down the stairs singing about his 'hands feeling like two balloons' from Comfortably Numb by Pink Floyd
 At the start of this episode, A.J. is in the living room, watching a Tom and Jerry short, "Yankee Doodle Mouse" on TV.
 Carmela quotes to AJ from In Memoriam by Alfred, Lord Tennyson: "better to have loved and lost".
 A.J. is watching the movie Annapolis when Tony comes downstairs at night.
 While A.J. is switching channels, Tony spots the John Wayne movie Hellfighters.
 Tony says A.J. could have died in Iraq (meaning he would have been old enough to be enlisted) when Carm protests about him going to a strip club.
 Before Christopher murders J.T. Dolan, Dolan is writing a script for Law & Order. Michael Imperioli starred in five episodes of that show in a recurring role as Detective Nick Falco.
 After Tony and A.J. arrive home to find Carmela and Meadow up, snacking, Carmela mentions that they stayed up to see Rachael Ray on Leno.
 Carmela reads Rebel-in-Chief by Fred Barnes, a book about George W Bush.

Music
 Tony sings a few lines from "Comfortably Numb" by Pink Floyd as he descends the stairs at the start of the episode.
 "White Flag" by Dido is playing at the pizza parlor when A.J. watches a couple kissing and breaks down in tears.
 The song playing while Tony is flirting with a stripper at the Bada Bing! is "Emma" by Hot Chocolate.
 While Jason Parisi is talking to Tony at the Bada Bing!, "Body Burn" by Cubanate and "Supermassive Black Hole" by Muse are played.
 The song played at the first frat party is "Salt Shaker" by Ying Yang Twins featuring Lil Jon and the East Side Boyz.
 The song playing at the party when Jason Parisi tells AJ about the financial benefits to be had taking sports bets from fellow students, and as a stripper offers AJ a lapdance (which he accepts, albeit with a marked lack of enthusiasm) is "Y.U.H.2.B.M.2" by Whitey.
 The song playing in the VIP room of the Bing when Christopher reconciles with Paulie is "Mood Indigo", performed by Keely Smith.
 The song played at the second frat party is "Hand On the Pump" by Cypress Hill.
 As Christopher exits the bar, El Michel's Affair's version of Isaac Hayes' cover of "Walk On By" can be heard playing.
 Tony is listening to "Tom Sawyer", by Rush, as he arrives home from the bar.
 The song played over the end credits is "The Valley" by Los Lobos.

References

External links
"Walk Like a Man"  at HBO

2007 American television episodes
The Sopranos (season 6) episodes
Television episodes written by Terence Winter